Ben Luz (born 18 February 1978) is a retired Israeli footballer.

Honours
Israeli Premier League (2):
1994-95, 1995-96
Toto Cup (2):
1998-99, 2001–02

References

External links

1978 births
Living people
Israeli footballers
Hapoel Haifa F.C. players
Maccabi Tel Aviv F.C. players
Hapoel Tel Aviv F.C. players
Bnei Yehuda Tel Aviv F.C. players
Hapoel Kfar Saba F.C. players
Hapoel Ramat Gan F.C. players
Israeli Premier League players
Association football midfielders
Israel international footballers